Mazhang is a district of Zhanjiang, Guangdong province, China.

See also
 Donghai Island
 Naozhou Island

References

County-level divisions of Guangdong
Zhanjiang